Adrian is an unincorporated community in Rock Creek Township, Hancock County, Illinois, United States. Adrian no longer has a post office, but is served by Dallas City. It hosts a grain elevator, Chemagro, and several houses. A former Disciples of Christ Church stands at the west end of the community, but is no longer active. The former one-room school at the east end of the community is now a farm machine shed.

History
Adrian was laid out in the 1870s, taking its name from Adrian, Michigan. A post office has been in operation at Adrian since 1870.

Geography

References

 

Unincorporated communities in Illinois
Unincorporated communities in Hancock County, Illinois